Shin Neung-kyun (born 1939), also known as Nelson Shin, is an animation director who is the founder and president of Akom Production Co., Ltd., in Seoul, South Korea. He founded Akom in 1985.

Career
In the 1970s, Shin worked as an animator at the DePatie–Freleng Enterprises  and Marvel Productions, where he worked on the Pink Panther films and Spider-Man and His Amazing Friends. While at DFE, he also contributed to the animation of the lightsaber blades in the original Star Wars.

Much of the animation Shin's studio has produced has been for American television series. Some of Akom's credits are: The Simpsons, Batman: The Animated Series, X-Men, Invasion America and Arthur. Shin's most well-known accomplishment is his direction of the television series The Transformers and The Transformers: The Movie. Shin also directed the first season of the Canadian animated TV series, Toad Patrol.

Beginning in 1999, Shin worked on the animated feature film Empress Chung. The film was largely animated in North Korea, and in August 2005 became the first movie ever to open simultaneously in North and South Korea.

In 2009, he was elected president of the International Animated Film Association, a post he held through 2012.

References

External links 
 "'The Simpsons' Made in South Korea", China Daily, March 5, 2005.
 

1939 births
International Animated Film Association
Living people
People from North Hwanghae
South Korean animators
South Korean businesspeople
South Korean animated film directors